"Still Got It" is a song by American rapper Tyga featuring fellow Young Money-member, Drake. The song was released on October 4, 2011 as the second single from the rapper's debut studio album, Careless World: Rise of the Last King. The song was produced by Noah "40" Shebib and Supa Dups, appearing as a bonus track on the iTunes Store deluxe edition of the album and as a Hidden Track on the physical copies of this one. "Still Got It" marks the rapper's third consecutive release to impact the US Billboard Hot 100, debuting at number 89 for the chart week dated October 24, 2011; also peaking at number 70 on the US Hot R&B/Hip-Hop Songs.

Track listing

Music video
The music video was filmed on New York Street at Paramount Studios in Hollywood, California. RichGirl's Audra Simmons is the lead girl in the video. Singer Teyana Taylor appears in the video. The music video premiered on BET's 106 and Park on April 30, 2012. Drake does not make an appearance in the video. The video, set in 1988 Harlem, depicts Tyga returning home reassuring that he has not changed while successfully vying for a former flame (Audra Simmons) which he succeeds in. Eventually, her jealous ex comes to a party and forcibly take her away as gunshots are heard.

Chart performance
Still Got It made its first chart appearance on the US Billboard Hot 100 the chart week ending October 24, 2011. The single debuted at number 89, marking the third consecutive release from Tyga to do so. The song, which spent only one week on the chart, also debuted at number 70 on the Hot R&B/Hip-Hop Songs chart; peaking higher than previous track "Far Away" (2011) - which peaked at number 90.

Charts

Release history

References

2011 singles
Tyga songs
Drake (musician) songs
Cash Money Records singles
Songs written by Drake (musician)
Song recordings produced by 40 (record producer)
Songs written by 40 (record producer)
Universal Republic Records singles
2011 songs
Songs written by Tyga
Songs written by Supa Dups